Manulea debilis is a moth of the family Erebidae. It is found in Russia (Altai, Sajan, Transbaicalia, Jakutia) and Mongolia.

References

Moths described in 1887
Lithosiina